There are several rivers named Das Pedras River or Rio das Pedras:

Brazil
 Das Pedras River (Bahia)
 Das Pedras River (Goiás)
 Das Pedras River (Anhumas River tributary), São Paulo
 Das Pedras River (Una da Aldeia River tributary), São Paulo
 Das Pedras River (Santa Catarina)

See also
 Rio das Pedras (disambiguation)